Denys Bobrov (born 1982) is a Ukrainian retired footballer.

Career
Denys Bobrov, started his career with Systema-Boreks Borodianka, Boreks-Borysfen, Polissya Zhytomyr. In 2004 he moved to Desna Chernihiv, the main city of Chernihiv in Ukrainian Second League which got second in the season 2004–05. In 2005 he moved to Tytan Armiansk until 2010 where he played 77 matches and the he moved to Mykolaiv for two season where he played 14 matches. In 2011 he played 8 games with Stal Kamianske and 9 with Myr Hornostayivka. In 2012 he moved to Zhemchuzhina Yalta and to Tytan Armiansk. In summer 2013 he moved to Myr Hornostayivka for one season where he played 22 matches. In 2015 he moved to Inhulets Petrove for two season where with the club he won the Ukrainian Second League in the season 2015–16 and he played 1 match for Inhulets-2 Petrove.

Honours
Inhulets Petrove
 Ukrainian Second League: 2015–16

Desna Chernihiv
 Ukrainian Second League: Runner-Up 2004–05

References

External links 
 Denys Bobrov at footballfacts.ru
 Denys Bobrov at allplayers.in.ua

1982 births
Living people
FC Systema-Boreks Borodianka players
FC Polissya Zhytomyr players
FC Desna Chernihiv players
FC Tytan Armyansk players
MBC Mykolaiv players
FC Stal Kamianske players
FC Myr Hornostayivka players
FC Zhemchuzhyna Yalta players
FC Inhulets Petrove players
FC Inhulets-2 Petrove players
Ukrainian footballers
Ukrainian Premier League players
Ukrainian First League players
Ukrainian Second League players
Association football goalkeepers